International Society may refer to the following:
 International Society of Sculptors, Painters and Gravers
 English school of international relations theory
 International Society for Krishna Consciousness
 International Society for Contemporary Music
 International Society of Automation

See also
:Category:International organizations